Year 487 (CDLXXXVII) was a common year starting on Thursday (link will display the full calendar) of the Julian calendar. At the time, it was known as the Year of the Consulship of Boethius without colleague (or, less frequently, year 1240 Ab urbe condita). The denomination 487 for this year has been used since the early medieval period, when the Anno Domini calendar era became the prevalent method in Europe for naming years.

Events 
 By place 
 Europe 
 King Odoacer leads an army to victory against the Rugians in Noricum (modern Austria). 
 Asia 
 Emperor Kenzō of Japan, age 38, dies after a reign of only three years.

 Central America 
July 28 – Bʼutz Aj Sak Chiik becomes the new ruler of the Mayan city-state of Palenque what is now the state of Chiapas in southern Mexico and reigns until his death in 501.

 By topic 
 Religion 
 The Lateran Council, convened by Pope Felix III, establishes conditions for readmitting to the Church those Christians who have been rebaptized by the Vandals.

Births 
 Sacerdos of Lyon, French archbishop (d. 551)
 Xiao Baoyin, prince of Southern Qi (d. 530)

Deaths 
 Gao Yun, duke of Northern Wei (b. 390) 
 Kenzō, emperor of Japan (approximate date)
 Syagrius, "king of the Romans" (approximate date)

References